New Hope High School may refer to:

 New Hope High School (New Hope, Alabama), New Hope, Alabama
 New Hope High School (Mississippi), Columbus, Mississippi

 New Hope High School (New Hope, Virginia), a historic public school building